Hajjiabad (also Romanized as Ḩājjīābād) is a village in Faryab Rural District, in the Central District of Rudan County, Hormozgan Province, Iran. At the 2006 census, its population was 555, in 112 families.

References 

Populated places in Rudan County